Bogue is a city in Graham County, Kansas, United States.  As of the 2020 census, the population of the city was 155.  Bogue is located on K-18, south of U.S. Route 24, on the South Fork Solomon River.

History
Bogue was established in 1888 as a railroad town. It originally was named Wild Horse but the Union Pacific Railroad changed the name to honor Virgil Gay Bogue, a civil engineer working for the railroad and the founder of the city.

The first post office in Bogue was established in September 1888. It was moved from Fagan.

Geography
Bogue is located at  (39.359648, −99.688282).

Climate
The climate in this area is characterized by hot, humid summers and generally mild to cool winters.  According to the Köppen Climate Classification system, Bogue has a humid subtropical climate, abbreviated "Cfa" on climate maps.

Demographics

2010 census
As of the census of 2010, there were 143 people, 75 households, and 43 families residing in the city. The racial makeup of the city was 93.7% White, 2.8% African American, 2.1% Asian, and 1.4% from two or more races. Hispanic or Latino of any race were 1.4% of the population.

There were 75 households, of which 13.3% had children under the age of 18 living with them, 54.7% were married couples living together, 1.3% had a female householder with no husband present, 1.3% had a male householder with no wife present, and 42.7% were non-families. 36.0% of all households were made up of individuals, and 14.6% had someone living alone who was 65 years of age or older. The average household size was 1.91 and the average family size was 2.42.

The median age in the city was 54.3 years. 10.5% of residents were under the age of 18; 4.2% were between the ages of 18 and 24; 18.2% were from 25 to 44; 32.2% were from 45 to 64; and 35% were 65 years of age or older. The gender makeup of the city was 48.3% male and 51.7% female.

2000 census
As of the census of 2000, there were 179 people, 77 households, and 55 families residing in the city. The racial makeup of the city was 97.77% White, 1.68% African American, 0.56% from other races. Hispanic or Latino of any race were 1.68% of the population.

There were 77 households, out of which 27.3% had children under the age of 18 living with them, 66.2% were married couples living together, 6.5% had a female householder with no husband present, and 27.3% were non-families. 26.0% of all households were made up of individuals, and 18.2% had someone living alone who was 65 years of age or older. The average household size was 2.32 and the average family size was 2.79.

In the city, the population was spread out, with 24.0% under the age of 18, 3.4% from 18 to 24, 26.3% from 25 to 44, 17.9% from 45 to 64, and 28.5% who were 65 years of age or older. The median age was 43 years. For every 100 females, there were 105.7 males. For every 100 females age 18 and over, there were 88.9 males.

The median income for a household in the city was $26,458, and the median income for a family was $33,750. Males had a median income of $31,250 versus $15,000 for females. The per capita income for the city was $14,403. About 10.3% of families and 10.3% of the population were below the poverty line, including 20.0% of those under the age of eighteen and none of those 65 or over.

Education
The community is served by Graham County USD 281 public school district. The district high school is located in Hill City.

Bogue High School was closed in 1978 through school unification. The Bogue High School mascot was Bluejays. The Bogue Bluejays won the following Kansas State High School championships:
 1969 Boys Track & Field (Indoor) – 1A 
 1976 Football – 8-Man 
 1977 Boys Track & Field (Indoor) – 1A

References

Further reading

External links
 Bogue – Directory of Public Officials
 Bogue city map, KDOT

Cities in Kansas
Cities in Graham County, Kansas
Populated places established in 1888
1888 establishments in Kansas